Villers-Bocage is a commune in the Somme department in Hauts-de-France in northern France.

Geography
The commune is situated 8 miles (13 km) north of Amiens, on the N25 road.

Population

See also
Communes of the Somme department

References

External links

Website of the commune’s orchestra 

Communes of Somme (department)